Ramilton Jorge Santos do Rosário (born 4 October 1989), known as Rambé, is a Cape Verdean professional footballer who plays for Académica do Mindelo as a striker.

Club career
Rambé was born in São Vicente. He started out in his native country with Batuque and Mindelense before moving to Portugal in 2010, where he played one season apiece in the third division with Macedo de Cavaleiros and Pinhalnovense.

In the 2012 off-season, Rambé signed for Belenenses in the second level. He missed the first three months of his first season, due to injury.

In the following years, Rambé alternated between the Portuguese second tier and the Primeira Liga, representing Belenenses, Farense (two spells), Braga B and Vitória de Setúbal. He made his debut in the latter competition on 12 January 2014 whilst at the service of the first club, playing the full 90 minutes in a 0–2 away loss against Arouca, and scored his first during his spell with the latter, contributing to a 1–0 win at Vitória de Guimarães on 14 March 2015.

On 15 July 2016, Rambé moved to Romanian side Universitatea Craiova, joining compatriots Kay and Nuno Rocha. He left in January 2017, signing with 1º de Agosto of the Angolan Girabola the following month.

After two years without a club, Rambé returned to his homeland in September 2019 to sign a one-year contract with Académica do Mindelo.

International career
Rambé made his debut for Cape Verde in 2011. He was named for the squad that appeared at the 2013 Africa Cup of Nations.

References

External links

1989 births
Living people
People from São Vicente, Cape Verde
Cape Verdean footballers
Association football forwards
Batuque FC players
CS Mindelense players
Académica do Mindelo players
Primeira Liga players
Liga Portugal 2 players
Segunda Divisão players
C.D. Pinhalnovense players
C.F. Os Belenenses players
S.C. Farense players
S.C. Braga B players
Vitória F.C. players
Liga I players
CS Universitatea Craiova players
Girabola players
C.D. Primeiro de Agosto players
Cape Verde international footballers
2013 Africa Cup of Nations players
Cape Verdean expatriate footballers
Expatriate footballers in Portugal
Expatriate footballers in Romania
Expatriate footballers in Angola
Cape Verdean expatriate sportspeople in Portugal
Cape Verdean expatriate sportspeople in Romania
Cape Verdean expatriate sportspeople in Angola